Burgin may refer to:

People
 Diana Lewis Burgin, American author and professor of Russian
 Elise Burgin (born 1962), American tennis player
 Elizabeth Burgin, American patriot during the American Revolutionary War
 Eric Burgin (1924–2012), English cricketer and footballer
 Graham Burgin (born 1948), Australian rules football player
 Leslie Burgin (1887–1945), British politician
 Melchior Bürgin (born 1943), Swiss rower
 Mona Burgin (1903–1985), teacher and active in the Girl Guiding movement
 Rachel Burgin (born 1982), Republican member of the Florida House of Representatives, United States
 Richard Burgin (violinist) (1893–1981), Polish-American violinist
 Richard Burgin (writer), American fiction writer, editor, composer, critic, and academic
 Romus Burgin (born 1922), WW II veteran and author
 Ted Burgin (1927–2019), English soccer player
 Victor Burgin (born 1941), English writer, artist
 William O. Burgin (1877–1946), United States Representative from North Carolina

Places
 Burgin, Kentucky, United States
 Clarence Burgin House, Quincy, Massachusetts, United States
 Khirbat Umm Burj or Burgin, Israel

See also
 Burgwyn, a surname